These hits topped the Ultratop 50 in the Flanders region of Belgium in 1987.

See also
1987 in music

References

1987 in Belgium
1987 record charts
1987